The Last Card is an extant 1921 silent romantic drama film directed by Bayard Veiller and starring May Allison. It was produced and distributed by Metro Pictures to poor audience reception.

Cast
May Allison
Alan Roscoe
Stanley Goethals
Frank Elliott
Irene Hunt
Dana Todd
Wilton Taylor

Preservation status
A copy is held by the George Eastman House Motion Picture Collection.

References

External links

1921 films
American romantic drama films
Metro Pictures films
American black-and-white films
American silent feature films
1921 romantic drama films
1920s American films
Silent romantic drama films
Silent American drama films